Mainer may refer to:

 Mainer (American), a person from Maine
 Mainer (magazine), an alternative magazine published in Portland, Maine formerly known as The Bollard
 Martin Mainer (born 1959), Czech artist and professor
 Wade Mainer (born 1907), American singer and banjoist